Gossaigaon Assembly constituency is one of the 126 constituencies of the Assam Legislative Assembly in India. Gossaigaon forms a part of the Kokrajhar Lok Sabha constituency.

Members of Legislative Assembly

Election results

2021 bypoll

2021

2016 result

References

External links 
 

Assembly constituencies of Assam
Kokrajhar district